Phar Lap (4 October 1926 – 5 April 1932) was a champion New Zealand–bred Thoroughbred racehorse who is widely regarded as New Zealand's greatest racehorse ever. Achieving incredible success during his distinguished career, his initial underdog status gave people hope during the early years of the Great Depression. He won the Melbourne Cup, two Cox Plates, the Australian Derby, and 19 other weight-for-age races.

One of his greatest performances was winning the Agua Caliente Handicap in Mexico in track-record time in his final race. He won in a different country, after a bad start many lengths behind the leaders, with no training before the race, and he split his hoof during the race.

After a sudden and mysterious illness, Phar Lap died in 1932 in Atherton, California. At the time, he was the third-highest stakes-winner in the world. His mounted hide is displayed at the Melbourne Museum, his skeleton at the Museum of New Zealand, and his heart at the National Museum of Australia.

Name
The name Phar Lap derives from the common Zhuang and Thai word for lightning: ฟ้าแลบ , literally 'sky flash'.

Phar Lap was called "The Wonder Horse," "The Red Terror," and "Big Red" (the latter nickname was also given to two of the greatest United States racehorses, Man o' War and Secretariat). He was affectionately known as "Bobby" to his strapper Tommy Woodcock He was also sometimes referred to as "Australia's Wonder Horse."

According to the Museum of Victoria, Aubrey Ping, a medical student at the University of Sydney, suggested "farlap" as the horse's name. Ping knew the word from his father, a Zhuang-speaking Chinese immigrant. Phar Lap's trainer Harry Telford liked the name, but changed the F to PH to create a seven letter word, which was split in two in keeping with the dominant naming pattern of Melbourne Cup winners.

Early life 
A chestnut gelding, Phar Lap was foaled on 4 October 1926 in Seadown near Timaru in the South Island of New Zealand. He was sired by Night Raid from Entreaty by Winkie. He was by the same sire as the Melbourne Cup winner Nightmarch. Phar Lap was a brother to seven other horses, Fortune's Wheel, Nea Lap (won 5 races), Nightguard, All Clear, Friday Night, Te Uira and Raphis, none of which won a principal (stakes) race. He was a half-brother to another four horses, only two of which were able to win any races at all.

Sydney trainer Harry Telford persuaded American businessman David J. Davis to buy the colt at auction, based on his pedigree. Telford's brother Hugh, who lived in New Zealand, was asked to bid up to 190 guineas at the 1928 Trentham Yearling Sales. When the horse was obtained for a mere 160 guineas, he thought it was a great bargain until the colt arrived in Australia. The horse was gangly, his face was covered with warts, and he had an awkward gait. Davis was furious when he saw the colt as well, and refused to pay to train the horse. Telford had not been particularly successful as a trainer, and Davis was one of his few remaining owners. To placate Davis, he agreed to train the horse for nothing, in exchange for a two-thirds share of any winnings. Telford leased the horse for three years and was eventually sold joint ownership by Davis.

Although standing a winning racehorse at stud could be quite lucrative, Telford gelded Phar Lap anyway, hoping the colt would concentrate on racing.

Racing career 
Phar Lap finished last in the first race and did not place in his next three races. He won his first race on 27 April 1929, the Maiden Juvenile Handicap at Rosehill, ridden by Jack Baker of Armidale, a 17-year-old apprentice. He didn't race for several months but was then entered in a series of races, in which he moved up in class. Phar Lap took second in the Chelmsford Stakes at Randwick on 14 September 1929, and the racing community started treating him with respect. He won the Rosehill Guineas by three lengths on 21 September 1929, ridden by James L. Munro.

As his achievements grew, there were some who tried to halt his progress. Criminals tried to shoot Phar Lap on the morning of Saturday 1 November 1930 after he had finished track work. They missed, and later that day he won the Melbourne Stakes, and three days later the Melbourne Cup as odds-on favourite at 8 to 11.

In the four years of his racing career, Phar Lap won 37 of 51 races he entered, including the Melbourne Cup, being ridden by Jim Pike, in 1930 with 9 st 12 lb. In that year and 1931, he won 14 races in a row. From his win as a three-year-old in the VRC St. Leger Stakes until his final race in Mexico, Phar Lap won 32 of 35 races. In the three races that he did not win, he ran second on two occasions, beaten by a short head and a neck, and in the 1931 Melbourne Cup he finished eighth when carrying 10 st 10 lb.

Phar Lap at the time was owned by American businessman David J. Davis and leased to Telford. After their three-year lease agreement ended, Telford had enough money to become joint owner of the horse. Davis then had Phar Lap shipped to North America to race. Telford did not agree with this decision and refused to go, so Davis, who along with his wife traveled to Mexico with him, brought Phar Lap's strapper Tommy Woodcock as his new trainer. Phar Lap was shipped by boat to Agua Caliente Racetrack near Tijuana, Mexico, to compete in the Agua Caliente Handicap, which was offering the largest prize money ever offered in North America racing. Phar Lap won in track-record time while carrying 129 pounds (58.5 kg). The horse was ridden by Australian jockey Billy Elliot for his seventh win from seven rides. From there, the horse was sent to a private ranch near Menlo Park, California, while his owner negotiated with racetrack officials for special race appearances.

Death 
Early on 5 April 1932, the horse's strapper for the North American visit, Tommy Woodcock, found him in severe pain and with a high temperature. Within a few hours, Phar Lap haemorrhaged to death. An autopsy revealed that the horse's stomach and intestines were inflamed, leading many to believe the horse had been deliberately poisoned. There have been alternative theories, including accidental poisoning from lead insecticide and a stomach condition. It was not until the 1980s that the infection could be formally identified.

In 2000, equine specialists studying the two necropsies concluded that Phar Lap probably died of duodenitis-proximal jejunitis, an acute bacterial gastroenteritis.

In 2006, Australian Synchrotron Research scientists said it was almost certain Phar Lap was poisoned with a large single dose of arsenic in the hours before he died, perhaps supporting the theory that Phar Lap was killed on the orders of US gangsters, who feared the Melbourne Cup-winning champion would inflict big losses on their illegal bookmakers. No real evidence of involvement by a criminal element exists, however.

Sydney veterinarian Percy Sykes believes deliberate poisoning did not cause the death. He said "In those days, arsenic was quite a common tonic, usually given in the form of a solution (Fowler's Solution)", and suggests this was the cause of the high levels. "It was so common that I'd reckon 90 percent of the horses had arsenic in their system."

In December 2007, Phar Lap's mane was tested for multiple doses of arsenic which, if found, would point to accidental poisoning.

In April 2008, an 82-page handwritten notebook belonging to Telford and containing recipes for tonics given to Phar Lap in the days before swabbing was sold by a Melbourne auction house. It showed that Phar Lap was given tonics designed to boost his performance that included arsenic, strychnine, cocaine and caffeine. The find gave credence to Woodcock's deathbed admission in 1985 that Phar Lap may have been given an overdose of a tonic before the horse died in 1932. The notebook was sold to the Melbourne Museum for $37,000.

On 19 June 2008, the Melbourne Museum released the findings of the forensic investigation conducted by Ivan Kempson, University of South Australia, and Dermot Henry, Natural Science Collections at Museum Victoria. Kempson analyzed six hairs from Phar Lap's mane at the Advanced Photon Source at Argonne National Laboratory near Chicago. These high resolution X-rays detect arsenic in hair samples, showing the specific difference "between arsenic, which had entered the hair cells via the blood and arsenic which had infused the hair cells by the taxidermy process when he was stuffed and mounted at the museum".

Kempson and Henry discovered that in the 30 to 40 hours before Phar Lap's death, the horse ingested a massive dose of arsenic. "We can't speculate where the arsenic came from, but it was easily accessible at the time", Henry said.

In October 2011 the Sydney Morning Herald published an article in which a New Zealand physicist and information from Phar Lap's strapper state that the great horse was never given any tonic with arsenic and that he died of an infection. Said Putt, "Unless we are prepared to say that Tommy Woodcock was a downright liar, which even today, decades after the loveable and respected horseman's death, would ostracise us with the Australian racing public, we must accept him on his word. The ineluctable conclusion we are left with, whether we like it or not, is that Phar Lap's impeccable achievements here and overseas were utterly tonic, stimulant, and drug-free."

Contradicting this is the tonic book of Harry Telford, Phar Lap's owner and trainer, on display in Museum Victoria, Melbourne. One recipe for a "general tonic" has a main ingredient of arsenic and has written below it: "A great tonic for all horses". Several theories have been proposed for the large amount of arsenic in Phar Lap's body.

Legacy

Following his death, Phar Lap's heart was donated to the Institute of Anatomy in Canberra and his skeleton to the New Zealand's National Museum in Wellington. After preparations of the hide by New York City taxidermist Louis Paul Jonas, Phar Lap's stuffed body was placed in the Australia Gallery at Melbourne Museum. The hide and the skeleton were put on exhibition together when Wellington's Te Papa Museum lent the skeleton to the Melbourne Museum in September 2010 as part of celebrations for the 150th running of the 2010 Melbourne Cup.

Now held at the National Museum of Australia in Canberra, it is the object visitors most often request to see. The author and film maker Peter Luck is convinced the heart is a fake. In Luck's 1979 television series This Fabulous Century, the daughter of Walker Neilson, the government veterinarian who performed the first post-mortem on Phar Lap, says her father told her the heart was necessarily cut to pieces during the autopsy, and the heart on display is that of a draughthorse. However the expression "a heart as big as Phar Lap" to describe a very generous or courageous person became a popular idiom.

Several books and films have featured Phar Lap, including the 1983 film Phar Lap, and the song "Phar Lap—Farewell To You".

Phar Lap was one of five inaugural inductees into both the Australian Racing Hall of Fame and New Zealand Racing Hall of Fame. In the Blood-Horse magazine ranking of the Top 100 U.S. Thoroughbred champions of the 20th century, Phar Lap was ranked No. 22.

The horse is considered to be a national icon in both Australia and New Zealand. In 1978 he was honoured on a postage stamp issued by Australia Post and features in the Australian citizenship test.

Phar Lap has been honoured with a $500,000 life-sized bronze memorial near his birthplace in Timaru, New Zealand, that was revealed on 25 November 2009, and a life-sized bronze statue at Flemington Racecourse in Melbourne. "Phar Lap Raceway" in Washdyke, New Zealand (where he was foaled), was named in his honour, with a life-size statue at the entrance.

Phar Lap has several residential streets named after him in Australia, New Zealand, and the United States. (In many cases, the name is merged into a single word "Pharlap".)

In 1931, Gilbert Percy Whitley, an ichthyologist at the Australian Museum, proposed a new genus of seahorse, Farlapiscis, named after Phar Lap. Farlapiscis was subsequently categorized as a junior synonym of the genus Hippocampus.

Race Record

1928/1929: Two-year-old season

1929/1930: Three-year-old season

1930/1931: Four-year-old season

1931/1932: Five-year-old season

Total: 51 starts – 37 wins, 3 seconds, 2 thirds, 2 fourths, 7 unplaced

Pedigree

See also 
 Thoroughbred racing in Australia
 Thoroughbred racing in New Zealand
 List of Melbourne Cup winners
 List of notable Thoroughbred racehorses
 List of historical horses
 New Zealand Racing Hall of Fame
 Repeat winners of horse races

Notes

External links 

 Killing Phar Lap: A Forensic Investigation Podcast
 Phar Lap at Museum Victoria, Melbourne Australia
 Phar Lap at Te Papa, New Zealand
 Phar Lap's heart at the National Museum of Australia, Canberra 
 National Museum of Australia: Protecting and photographing Phar Lap's heart 
 Phar Lap Australia's Wonder Horse
 Digital Photo Collection on Phar Lap
 Images and link to the story of Phar Lap at Museum Victoria 
 Photo album owned by David Davis, owner of Phar Lap 
 Photos of Phar Lap's heart 

1926 racehorse births
1932 racehorse deaths
Australian Racing Hall of Fame horses
New Zealand Racing Hall of Fame horses
Racehorses bred in New Zealand
Racehorses trained in Australia
Melbourne Cup winners
Cox Plate winners
Victoria Derby winners
Horse monuments
Thoroughbred family 2-r
Animal sculptures in Australia
Individual taxidermy exhibits
Deaths from arsenic poisoning